is a passenger railway station in located in the city of Izumi, Osaka Prefecture, Japan, operated by West Japan Railway Company (JR West).

Lines

Station layout
The station consists of two island platforms connected by an elevated station building. The station has a Midori no Madoguchi  staffed ticket office.

Platforms

Adjacent stations

|-
!colspan=5|JR West

History
Izumi-Fuchū Station opened on 18 July 1929. With the privatization of the Japan National Railways (JNR) on 1 April 1987, the station came under the aegis of the West Japan Railway Company.

Station numbering was introduced in March 2018 with Izumi-Fuchū being assigned station number JR-R37.

Passenger statistics
In fiscal 2019, the station was used by an average of 17,521 passengers daily (boarding passengers only).

Surrounding area
 Izumi City Hall
Izumi Municipal Stadium
Izumi City General Medical Center
Izumi Municipal Kokufu Elementary School
Izumi City Izumi Junior High School

See also
List of railway stations in Japan

References

External links

 Izumi-Fuchū Station Official Site

Railway stations in Osaka Prefecture
Railway stations in Japan opened in 1929
Izumi, Osaka